Maryland Fall Baseball was a professional baseball league located in Maryland and Delaware that was affiliated with Major League Baseball. The league lasted one season, playing in September and October, 1998.

History 
Maryland Fall Baseball was the second in a series of attempts by Major League Baseball to establish a second winter league to supplement the Arizona Fall League. In this Maryland Fall Baseball was preceded by Hawaii Winter Baseball (1994-1997), and succeeded by the California Fall League (1999) and Hawaii Winter Baseball (2006-2008).

Maryland Fall Baseball did not receive subsidies from Major League Baseball. Major League teams paid their own players, but did not cover front office staff, travel and equipment, leaving the Maryland league to rely almost exclusively on sponsorships and ticket sales, with a percentage of ticket revenue also allotted to Major League Baseball.

After the season, having averaged about 900 fans a game, Maryland Fall Baseball was reported to have requested a subsidy of "somewhere between $1,500 and $2,500 per player" to continue the league, which Major League Baseball declined.

Teams

See also 
 California Fall League
 Hawaii Winter Baseball

References 

Baseball leagues in Maryland
Defunct minor baseball leagues in the United States
Winter baseball leagues
Sports leagues established in 1998
Sports leagues disestablished in 1998
1998 establishments in Maryland
1998 disestablishments in Maryland
1998 establishments in Delaware
1998 disestablishments in Delaware
1998 in sports in Maryland
1998 in sports in Delaware
Defunct baseball teams in Maryland
Baseball leagues in Delaware